Saint Abdecalas (or Abdelas) was a Persian priest of advanced age who, together with another priest, Saint Ananias, and about a hundred other Christians, was killed under the Persian ruler Shapur II on Good Friday, 345. One of these others was also named Abdecalas.

St. Simeon, bishop of Seleucia, had been arrested by order of Sapor, king of Persia. He refused to adore the sun and was thrown in a narrow prison and remained there for a long time together with other 100 Christians, such as bishops, priests and clerks. The following day, which was a Good Friday, all his companions were strangled in his presence and he was beheaded. Abdecalas and Ananias, his priests, were martyred with him. They were the persons of distinguished merits.

The historian Sozomen estimates the number of Christians martyred during the forty-year reign of Shapur as close to 16,000. The feast day for Saint Abdecalas is 21 April.

References

External links

Year of birth unknown
345 deaths
Persian saints
Assyrian Church of the East saints
4th-century Christian martyrs
People executed by the Sasanian Empire
Christians in the Sasanian Empire